Jacobszoon is a surname. Notable people with the surname include:

Jan Jacobszoon Hinlopen (1626–1666), rich Dutch cloth merchant, officer in the civic guard, real estate developer, alderman and art collector
Jan Jacobszoon May van Schellinkhout, Dutch seafarer and explorer
Lenaert Jacobszoon, captain of the Dutch East India Company who, in 1618 sighted North West Cape in the north-west of Western Australia